The 1990 FIFA World Cup qualification UEFA Group 3 was a UEFA qualifying group for the 1990 FIFA World Cup. The group comprised Austria, East Germany, Iceland, the Soviet Union and Turkey.

The group was won by the Soviet Union, who qualified for the 1990 FIFA World Cup. Austria also qualified as runners-up.

Standings

Results

Goalscorers
There were 47 goals scored during the 20 games, an average of 2.35 goals per game.

5 goals

 Toni Polster
 Tanju Çolak

4 goals

 Andreas Thom

3 goals

 Hennadiy Lytovchenko
 Oleh Protasov
 Rıdvan Dilmen
 Feyyaz Uçar

2 goals

 Andreas Herzog
 Matthias Sammer
 Pétur Pétursson
 Igor Dobrovolski
 Oleksiy Mykhaylychenko

1 goal

 Heimo Pfeifenberger
 Manfred Zsak
 Thomas Doll
 Rainer Ernst
 Ulf Kirsten
 Atli Eðvaldsson
 Sigurður Grétarsson
 Ragnar Margeirsson
 Guðmundur Torfason
 Oleksandr Zavarov
 Oğuz Çetin

3
1988–89 in East German football
1989–90 in East German football
1988–89 in Austrian football
Austria at the 1990 FIFA World Cup
1988–89 in Turkish football
1989–90 in Turkish football
1988 in Icelandic football
1989 in Icelandic football
1988 in Soviet football
1989 in Soviet football